The Lamborghini V10 is a ninety degree (90°) V10 petrol engine which was developed for the Lamborghini Gallardo automobile, first sold in 2003.

Developed by Lamborghini, for use in the Gallardo, and the first engine developed for Automobili Lamborghini S.p.A. after they were acquired by AUDI AG – part of the Volkswagen Group.

This engine has its origins in two concept cars made by Lamborghini, the 1988 P140 and the 1995 Calà. Both were equipped with engines having a 3.9-litre displacement. In the early 2000s, Lamborghini resumed the project and the engine was redesigned by increasing its displacement.

The crankcase and cylinder block are built at the Audi Hungaria Zrt. factory in Győr, Hungary, whilst final assembly is carried out at Sant'Agata Bolognese, Italy.  The engine has a 90° vee angle and, unusually for a production engine, a dry sump lubrication system is utilised to keep the center of gravity of the engine low.

There was also some speculation that the engine block of the original 5.0-litre Lamborghini V10 was closely based on the Audi 4.2 FSI V8, which Audi produces for its luxury cars. The cylinder heads use the four valves per cylinder layout favoured by the Italian firm, rather than the five valve per cylinder variation formerly favoured by the German members of Volkswagen Group – including Audi and Volkswagen Passenger Cars. It was later confirmed that the new 5.2-litre Lamborghini V10 is mechanically identical to the Audi 5.2 V10 engine, as is evident by Lamborghini's usage of Audi's Fuel Stratified Injection, and 90 mm cylinder spacing.

Specifications
engine configuration 90° V10 engine; dry sump lubrication system
engine displacement etc.
5.0 — ; bore x stroke: . Rod length is 154mm.  (Rod/stroke ratio:1.65), 496.1 cc per cylinder; compression ratio: 11.5:1
5.2 — ; bore x stroke: . Rod length is 154mm.  (Rod/stroke ratio:1.65), 520.4 cc per cylinder; compression ratio: 12.5:1
cylinder block and crankcase
5.0 — cast aluminium alloy with integrated liners with eutectic alloy;  cylinder bore spacing; forged steel crankshaft with 18° split crankpins to create even 72° firing intervals
5.2 — cast aluminium alloy; 90 mm cylinder bore spacing; forged steel crankshaft with non-split crankpins creating uneven firing intervals of 90° and 54°
cylinder heads and valvetrain cast aluminium alloy, four valves per cylinder, 40 valves total, low-friction roller cam followers with automatic hydraulic valve clearance compensation, chain driven double overhead camshafts, continuously variable valve timing system both for intake and exhaust
aspiration two air filters, two hot-film air mass meters, two cast alloy throttle bodies each with electronically controlled throttle valves, cast magnesium alloy variable geometry and resonance intake manifold
fuel system
5.0 — two linked common rail fuel distributor rails, electronic sequential multi-point indirect fuel injection with 10 intake manifold-sited fuel injectors
5.2 — fully demand-controlled and returnless; fuel tank mounted low pressure fuel pump, Fuel Stratified Injection (FSI): two inlet camshaft double-cam driven single-piston high-pressure injection pumps maintaining pressure in the two stainless steel common rail fuel distributor rails, ten combustion chamber sited direct injection solenoid-controlled sequential fuel injectors
ignition system and engine management mapped direct ignition with centrally mounted spark plugs and ten individual direct-acting single spark coils; two Lamborghini LIE electronic engine control unit (ECUs) working on the 'master and slave' concept due to the high revving nature of the engine
exhaust system
5.0 — five-into-one exhaust manifolds for each cylinder bank
5.2 — 2-1-2 branch exhaust manifold per cylinder bank to minimise reverse pulsation of expelled exhaust gasses
5.0 power and torque outputs and applications
  at 7,800 rpm;  at 4,500 rpm (80% available from 1,500 rpm) — Gallardo 2003-2005
  at 8,000 rpm;  at 4,250 rpm —  Gallardo SE, Spyder, and 2006-2008
  at 8,000 rpm;  at 4,250 rpm — Gallardo Superleggera
5.2 power and torque outputs and applications
  at 7,000 rpm;  at 6,500 rpm — Gallardo Super GT - 2008-2009
  at 8,000 rpm;  at 6,500 rpm — Gallardo LP550/2,  Balboni, Spyder, Bicolore, AD Personam, Singapore Limited Edition, Super Trofeo, Tricolore, Hong Kong 20th Anniversary Edition, Malaysia Limited Edition, India Serie Speciale, Indonesia Limited Edition, Edizione Tecnica - 2010-2013
  at 8,000 rpm;  at 6,500 rpm — Gallardo LP560/4, LP560/4 Spyder, Polizia, Gold Edition, Bicolore, LP560/4 Noctis, LP560/4 Bianco Rosso, Super Trofeo, LP560/4 GT, Reiter Extenso, Edizione Tecnica, LP560/2 50° Anniversario  - 2008-2013
  at 8,000 rpm;  at 6,500 rpm — Gallardo LP570/4 SuperLeggera, Spyder Performante, Edizione Tecnica, SuperLeggera Nero Nemesis, SuperLeggera Bianco Canopus, Super Trofeo Stradale, Squadra Corse, Macau GP Edition - 2010-2013
  at 8,000 rpm;  at 6,500 rpm — Gallardo GT3
  at 8,250 rpm;  at 6,500 rpm — Huracán LP610/4 coupé and spyder - 2014-2019 
  at 8,000 rpm;  at 6,500 rpm — Huracán LP580/2 coupé and spyder - 2016-present
  at 8,250 rpm;  at 6,500 rpm — Huracán LP620/2 Super Trofeo, GT3, Super Trofeo Evo - 2014-present 
  at 8,000 rpm;  at 6,500 rpm — Huracán LP640/4 Performaté coupé and spyder - 2017-present
  at 8,000 rpm;  at 6,500 rpm — Huracán LP640/4 Evo coupé and spyder - 2019-present

Vehicles
As of 2019, all V10s in the Lamborghini lineup after the first generation Gallardo use the 5.2-litre variant. They are:

Lamborghini
 Gallardo LP 550-2 
 Gallardo LP 550-2 Spyder
 Gallardo LP 560-4
 Gallardo LP 560-4 Spyder
 Gallardo LP 570-4 Superleggera Edizione Technica
 Gallardo LP 570-4 Spyder Performante Edizone Technica
 Gallardo LP 570-4 Squadra Corse
 Gallardo LP 550-2 Bicolore
 Gallardo LP 550-2 Tricolore 
 Gallardo LP 570-4 Super Trofeo Stradale
 Gallardo GT3-R
 Gallardo LP 600 GT3
 Sesto Elemento
 Egoista
 Huracán LP 610-4 Avio
 Huracán LP 580-2
 Huracán LP 580-2 Spyder
 Huracán LP 610-4 Spyder
 Huracán LP 610-4
 Huracán LP 620-2 Super Trofeo
 Huracán GT3
 Huracán Super Trofeo Evo
 Huracán Super Trofeo Omologata
 Huracán LP 640-4 Performante
 Huracán LP 640-4 Performante Spyder
 Huracán LP 640-4 Evo 
 Huracán LP 610-2 Evo RWD
 Huracán GT3 Evo
 Asterion LPI 910-4
 Urus Concept

Audi
R8 V10
S8 D3 
S6 C6 
RS 6 C6

(The Lamborghini V10 has also had a placement in the Audi R8, RS6, S8 and S6. The 5.2 V10 used in the S6 and S8 is different in several important aspects, namely a less robust crankshaft with a split pin design, cast aluminum pistons, and a traditional wet-sump oiling system, as well as differences in the valvetrain - all of which, combined, result in the much higher RPM red line and specific power output of the Gallardo and R8)

Italdesign
Zerouno
Zerouno Duerta

See also

V12 – 6.2/6.5 V12 430-471kW sub-section of the above article
V10 – 5.2 FSI V10 412kW sub-section of the above article
V10 – 5.0 V10 368kW sub-section of the above article

References

External links
Lamborghini.com official website

V10
Gasoline engines by model
V10 engines